Victoria High School may refer to:

In Canada:
Victoria High School (British Columbia), Victoria, British Columbia
Victoria School of the Arts, Edmonton, Alberta
Southern Victoria High School, Perth-Andover, New Brunswick
École Victoria School
Victoria School (Saskatoon) - historic one room schoolhouse

In Fiji:
Queen Victoria School (Fiji)

In Malaysia:
Victoria Institution, Malaysia

In Scotland:
Queen Victoria School, Stirling

In Singapore:
Victoria School, Singapore
Victoria Junior College, Singapore

In the United States:
Victoria High School (Kansas), Victoria, Kansas
Victoria Career Development School, Victoria, Texas
Victoria High School (Texas), Victoria, Texas
Victoria High School (Victoria, Virginia)

In the United Kingdom:
Ulverston Victoria High School, Cumbria

In Zimbabwe:
Victoria High School (Zimbabwe), Masvingo